RAIU or Raiu may refer to:

 Radioactive iodine uptake test for thyroid problems
 Railway Accident Investigation Unit, Ireland
 Raiu, a village administered by Murgeni town, Vaslui County, Romania